Stearne Tighe Edwards,  (13 February 1893 – 22 November 1918) was a Canadian flying ace of the First World War, officially credited with 17 victories. He was seriously injured in a crash the day after Armistice Day, and died from his injuries 10 days later.

Awards

Distinguished Service Cross
Edwards' Distinguished Service Cross was awarded for a series of actions. 
Bringing down a two-seater Aviatik on 3 September 1917
Driving "a two-seater enemy machine down out of control" on 21 September 1917
An Albatross scout which crashed into the sea on 23 September 1917. And bringing down another on the same day.

Distinguished Service Cross – Bar

References

External links
 

1893 births
1919 deaths
Canadian aviators
Canadian World War I flying aces
Canadian recipients of the Distinguished Service Cross (United Kingdom)